Jagseer Singh Mahar is an Indian Para athlete competing in Men's 100m, 200m, 400m and Long Jump events in the F46 category. In 2010, he was the first and only Indian player to win a gold medal in the first Asian Para Games held in Guangzhou China. Honoured with Arjuna Award in 2010.Honoured with Maharana Pratap Award in 2009.

Awards and recognition 
Arjuna Award (2010)
Maharana Pratap Award (2009)

References

External links

Living people
Paralympic athletes of India
Athletes (track and field) at the 2008 Summer Paralympics
Athletes (track and field) at the 2012 Summer Paralympics
Athletes (track and field) at the 2010 Commonwealth Games
Year of birth missing (living people)
Recipients of the Arjuna Award
Indian male sprinters
Indian male long jumpers
Indian male triple jumpers
Paralympic long jumpers
Paralympic triple jumpers
Medalists at the 2010 Asian Para Games
21st-century Indian people